The Abilene Christian Wildcats baseball team is a varsity intercollegiate athletic team of Abilene Christian University in Abilene, Texas, United States. The team is a member of the Western Athletic Conference, which is part of the National Collegiate Athletic Association's Division I. The team plays its home games at Crutcher Scott Field in Abilene, Texas. The Wildcats are currently coached by Rick McCarty.

Crutcher Scott Field

Crutcher Scott Field is a 4,000-seat baseball stadium located in Abilene, Texas. Built between 1990 and 1991, it hosted the Abilene Prairie Dogs from 1995 to 1999 and is the current home of the Abilene Christian Wildcats baseball team.  Located on the campus of Abilene Christian University, its seating is entirely metal, with a combination of fold down chairs and benches.

Major League Baseball
Abilene Christian has had 9 Major League Baseball Draft selections since the draft began in 1965.

See also
List of NCAA Division I baseball programs

References

External links